Salford East was a parliamentary constituency in the City of Salford in Greater Manchester. It returned one Member of Parliament (MP)  to the House of Commons of the Parliament of the United Kingdom.

The constituency was created for the 1950 general election, and abolished for the 1997 general election, when it was partially replaced by the new Salford constituency.

Boundaries 

1950–1983: The County Borough of Salford wards of Albert Park, Crescent, Kersal, Mandley Park, Ordsall Park, Regent, St Matthias, and Trinity.

1983–1997: The City of Salford wards of Blackfriars, Broughton, Claremont, Kersal, Langworthy, Ordsall, and Pendleton.

Members of Parliament

Elections

Elections in the 1950s

Elections in the 1960s

Elections in the 1970s

Elections in the 1980s

 

Note: This constituency underwent major boundary changes for the 1983 election and so changes are based on notional figures.

Elections in the 1990s

Notes and references 

Parliamentary constituencies in North West England (historic)
Constituencies of the Parliament of the United Kingdom established in 1950
Constituencies of the Parliament of the United Kingdom disestablished in 1997
Politics of Salford